The Lower Zambezi National Park lies on the north bank of the Zambezi River in southeastern Zambia. Until 1983 when the area was declared a national park, the area was the private game reserve of Zambia's president. This meant that the park was protected from mass tourism and now remains one of the few untouched wilderness areas left in Africa. On the opposite bank is Zimbabwe's Mana Pools National Park. The two parks sit on the Zambezi floodplain ringed by mountains. The area is a UNESCO World Heritage Site.

The park gently slopes from the Zambezi Escarpment down to the river, straddling two main woodland savannah ecoregions distinguished by the dominant types of tree, Miombo and Mopane: Southern Miombo woodlands on higher ground in the north, and Zambezian and Mopane woodlands on lower slopes in the south. At the edge of the river is floodplain habitat.

The park itself is ringed by a much larger game management area (commonly referred to as GMA); there are no fences between the park and the GMA and both animals and people are free to roam across the whole area. An attraction of the Lower Zambezi Park and its surrounding GMA is its remote location. There are no paved roads and tourists are unlikely to encounter other tourists. Common towns from which to access the park are Livingstone or Lusaka.

Most large mammals in the national park congregate on the floodplain, including the Cape buffalo, a large elephant population, lion, leopard, many antelope species, crocodile and hippopotamus. There are occasional sightings of the Cape wild dog. There are also a large number of species of birds.

See also

Wildlife of Zambia

References

External links 
Lower Zambezi National Park Website
 http://www.zambezi.com/location/lower_zambezi_national_park 
 http://www.zambiatourism.com/destinations/national-parks/lower-zambezi-national-park
 http://conservationlowerzambezi.org/
 https://www.zambia-in-style.com/lower-zambezi-national-park/

National parks of Zambia
Protected areas established in 1983
Geography of Lusaka Province
Zambezian and mopane woodlands
Important Bird Areas of Zambia